Thea Tereese Austin (born June 10, 1960) is an American singer/songwriter/composer from Pittsburgh, Pennsylvania. She is the lead vocalist and co-author of the German Eurodance hit song "Rhythm Is A Dancer" by Snap!

Early life and career
Austin was born on June 10, 1960, in Pittsburgh, Pennsylvania. She began singing with her older sister Vontelle at the age of four and by eight singing became her paying profession. In California, she was a music columnist for magazines including The R&B Report, an industry trade publication. She has four sisters, one brother, and has been married once.

Musical career

Snap!
In the early 1990s Austin finished a tour in Japan and upon returning to Los Angeles began writing for a solo album with dance music producer Michael Eckart (Stacey Q). She was introduced through a mutual friend to Penny Ford who had just left the group Snap! to pursue a solo career after the success of "The Power." Austin met in Germany with the producers Michael Munzing and Luca Anzilotti. The result of that meeting was the Snap! album The Madman's Return on which Austin wrote or co-wrote all of the songs including Snap!'s cross-Atlantic hit "Rhythm Is a Dancer." She received the BMI Pop Award in 2015 when Jeremih's hit "Don't 'Tell 'Em" incorporated her lyrics.

Originally, "Rhythm Is a Dancer" was going to be released as the lead single, but after objections from Turbo B, "Colour of Love", also co-written by Austin and featuring Austin's lead vocals, was released as the single. The song charted at number 6 in France and Sweden, number 9 in Germany and number 54 in the UK. "Rhythm Is a Dancer" fared better, charting at number 1 in the UK, France, Netherlands, Italy and Germany, and number 5 in the US. Other singles from the album co-written by Austin included "Do You See The Light" which would later be covered by Nikki Harris.

Soulsearcher
In 1999, Austin teamed with Marc Pomeroy to form Soulsearcher, which had a #8 hit on the UK Singles Chart with "Can't Get Enough" which drew inspiration from and sampled Gary's Gang's "Let's Lovedance Tonight" and later on that year charted at #20 on the Dance Music/Club Play Singles chart. The duo performed at The Prince's Trust Party in the Park all-star concert in London in 1999. Their second single, "Do It to Me Again", charted at #32 on the UK Singles Chart (AllMusic's entry for Soulsearcher states that the song charted at #13) after which Austin and Pomeroy split up.

Pusaka
Austin joined Pusaka and wrote and sung lead vocals for their 2001 hit "You're the Worst Thing for Me", which was awarded the Best Underground 12" Award at Miami's Winter Music Conference in March 2002 and charted at #34 on the Hot Dance Music/Maxi-Singles Sales chart and #1 on the Dance Music/Club Play Singles chart.

Boombox! 
A planned May 2022 concert residency at the Westgate Las Vegas titled "Boombox!" will feature an alternating cast of hip hop artists, including Austin, accompanied by a live DJ and drummer.

Charts

See also
List of number-one dance hits (United States)
List of artists who reached number one on the US Dance chart

References

20th-century African-American women singers
American dance musicians
American house musicians
Living people
Musicians from Pittsburgh
Songwriters from Pennsylvania
Singers from Pennsylvania
American women in electronic music
20th-century American singers
20th-century American women singers
21st-century American women singers
African-American songwriters
21st-century African-American women singers
1960 births
Snap! members